The Roland SH-201 is a discontinued 49 key, 10-voice polyphonic virtual analogue synthesizer introduced in 2006 by the Roland Corporation. The SH-201 was discontinued in 2010. At the NAMM 2010 show Roland introduced its successor, the Roland SH-01 Gaia.

Features
The SH-201 is equipped with two analogue modeling oscillators (four when in Dual or Split mode), a multi-mode filter, ring modulator, and it allows routing an external audio signal into its own dedicated filter. Real-time controls feature 29 front panel knobs and sliders, assignable pitch/mod stick and Roland's infrared D-Beam controller. The synthesizer also acts as a USB audio interface for digital audio workstation recording.

The layout of filters, envelopes, oscillator types, and mix options are similar to the JP-8000. Notable differences are that the SH-201 uses different adsr envelope and filter modeling, offers more polyphony, oscillator choices, LFO routings and comes with computer software for more in-depth sound editing, patch librarian storage and DAW integration. The name SH-201 is derived from Roland's classic SH line of analog synthesizers, all of which were designed to be portable and simple to program, while the number 201 was chosen to reference the popular SH-101 which was also cased in plastic. It is also fully Windows and Mac compatible, connecting through a USB cable. MIDI and audio can be sent through the USB port.

Notable users
 Hadouken!
 Abandon All Ships
 Bozon Higgs
 Calvin Harris (notable for the main synth hook in "I'm Not Alone")
 Disclosure
 Scissor Sisters
 Richard Barbieri
 Noisia
 Front 242
 The Neon Judgement
 Suicide Commando
 Insect Graveyard
 Marcus Brown (Madonna)
 Printz Board
 Scooter (Just on stage)
 JMR
 Joker
 Jean Michel Jarre
 Ladytron
 Asia (band)
 Geoff Downes
 Milk Inc.
 Timbaland
 Jamie Cullum
 Kaiser Chiefs
 Walk the Moon
 Grimes
 Alan Walker (used for live performances)

References

Further reading

External links
 SH-201 details - VintageSynth.com
 Roland US - official site
 Musicradar review
 EMusician review

SH-201
D-Beam
Virtual analog synthesizers
Polyphonic synthesizers
Digital synthesizers